Greyhound Lines operated a bus station and terminal in Portland, Oregon's Old Town Chinatown, until 2019. The building  was closed to the public, and as of fall 2020 was slated to operate as a temporarily homeless shelter.

References

External links
 

Buildings and structures in Portland, Oregon
Old Town Chinatown
Greyhound Lines
Northwest Portland, Oregon